Marriottella is a genus of tephritid  or fruit flies in the family Tephritidae.

Species
Marriottella exquisita Munro, 1939
Marriottella sepsoides Freidberg & Merz, 2006

References

Tephritinae
Tephritidae genera
Diptera of Africa